Lalan Paswan is an Indian politician. He was elected to the Bihar Legislative Assembly from Chenari constituency of Bihar in the February 2005 and October 2005 as a member of the Janata Dal (United) again 2015 Bihar Legislative Assembly election as a member of the Rashtriya Lok Samta Party.

References

Living people
Janata Dal (United) politicians
Samajwadi Janata Party politicians
Rashtriya Lok Samata politicians
Samata Party politicians
People from Rohtas district
Bihar MLAs 2015–2020
Year of birth missing (living people)
Bihar MLAs 2020–2025